The following list is a discography of productions by London on da Track, an American hip hop record producer and recording artist from Atlanta, Georgia. It includes a list of songs produced, co-produced and remixed by year, artist, album and title.

Singles produced

2011

Dem White Boyz – Why Not!?
06. "Shoestrings"

Maceo – Mexico City
09. "Mine" (feat. Tasha)

2012

Rich Kidz – Everybody Eat Bread
04. "Never Did"
05. "We So Deep" (feat. Trouble)
09. "Sunrise Interlude"
13. "Koo Koo" (feat. Slim Dunkin)
17. "Easy Water"
18. "Live From The Booth (Freestyle)"
19. "Pimp Or Slum" (feat. Sammy Dammy & RK Sabo)

Slim Dunkin & D-Bo – Block Illegal II: My Brother's Keeper
04. "Double Up" (produced with TM88)
07. "Rockstar" (feat. Roscoe Dash) (produced with TM88)
08. "Freezer Tag"
09. "All We Got"
13. "Feelin Myself" (feat. Trae tha Truth)
15. "I Be Flexin"
17. "Celebration"
20. "Missin You"
21. "If I Make It" (feat. Tasha Catour)

Dirt Gang – Welcome To Jurassic Park
10. "Double Up" (produced with TM88)

Waka Flocka Flame – Salute Me or Shoot Me 4 (Banned from America)
08. "Randy Savage" (feat. B. Ceeze and Frenchie)

Rich Kidz – Straight Like That 3
01. "You Won"
04. "Kool On The Low"
05. "Housewife"
06. "Fantasy"
12. "Most Tonight"
13. "In The Car"

2013

Sy Ari Da Kid & Dae Dae – Civil War 2: 2 Sides Of A Story
08. "Movin Up" (feat. Frenchie)

Chaz Gotti – Voice of Dunk
01. "VOD Intro"
05. "The Man" (feat. Waka Flocka Flame)
10. "Bring It Back" (feat. K Camp)
12. "Butt Naked Truth"

Strap Da Fool – All In
07. Heinz 57 (feat. Gucci Mane)

J Mike – Keys 2 the City
02. "Keys 2 Da City"

Quez – Black Boe Knows
03. "Dirty Money" (feat. Chico Ali)
14. "Shawty What's Yo Name" (feat. Strap Da Fool)

Waka Flocka Flame – DuFlocka Rant Halftime Show
07. "Red Ferrari" (feat. Sosay & Chaz Gotti)

D Dash – Mill B4 Dinner Time
07. "Don't Play Wit Me" (Chaz Gotti & Que)

Chaz Gotti – 808 Gotti
05. "What I Wanna Do" (feat. D Dash) (produced with Southside)

K-So – Glasses
15. "Ain't Nothin Personal"

Gucci Mane – Diary Of A Trap God
18. "Virgin" (feat. Young Dolph & Young Thug)

Rich Kidz – A West Side Story
01. "Make It"
07. "Winner" (feat. K Camp)
08. "More" (Produced with DJ Plugg)
14. "Pop That"

Trae tha Truth – I Am King
06. "Shit Crazy" (feat. D Dash Bo)

Yung Booke – City on My Back
10. "Neva Left" (feat. Smashgang Freaky & Lake Savage)

Rich Homie Quan – I Promise I Will Never Stop Going In
01. "They Don't Know"

Travis Porter – Mr. Porter
04. "I'm a Dog"
06. "My Bitch Bad"

2014

Strap Da Fool – All In 2
23. "I'm Up"
27. "Out Da Profit"

D Dash & Frenchie – Underrated
06. "Money Talks"

2 Chainz 
00. "Dresser (Lil Boy)" (feat. Young Thug)

Waka Flocka Flame – Re-Up
06. "How I'm Rockin"

Travis Porter – Music, Money, Magnums 2
01. "Attached"
07. "Andalay"
10. "She Knows" (feat. Problem)
11. "Geekin'"

Gucci Mane – The Return Of Mr. Perfect
08. "Filthy Large" (feat. Strap Da Fool)
10. "Night Rider"

Chaz Gotti – Wait'n
02. "Million Dollars'"
03. "Babies Cryin'" (feat. Migos) (Produced with DJ Spinz)
08. "Bring It Back" (feat. K Camp & Stuey Rock)
09. "Days On The Southside"
10. "No Trust" (feat. K Camp)
11. "The Man" (feat. Waka Flocka Flame)

Rich Gang – Tha Tour Part 1
06. "Flava" (Young Thug & Rich Homie Quan)
07. "730"
09. "Tell Em (Lies)" (Young Thug & Rich Homie Quan)
12. "Imma Ride" (Young Thug, Rich Homie Quan, & Birdman)
14. "Keep It Goin"

2015

Lil Wayne – Sorry 4 the Wait 2
15. "No Haters"
00. "Amazing Amy" (feat. Migos)

2 Chainz - T.R.U. Jack City
16. “Can't Tell Me Shyt” (feat. Skooly & Cap 1)

The Real University – T.R.U. Jack City
13. "Can't Tell Me Shyt" (by Cap 1 and Skooly)

Soundz – Like Jordan
15. "Stephanie" (produced with Soundz)

Young Thug – Barter 6
02. "With That" (feat. Duke)
04. "Check"
12. "Numbers"

Boosie Badazz – Touchdown 2 Cause Hell
06. "Retaliation"

Lil Durk – Remember My Name
10. "Why Me"

Lil Wayne – Free Weezy Album
05. "London Roads"

Young Jeezy – Gangsta Party
01. "I Might" (feat. Rich Homie Quan)

T.I. – Da' Nic
04. "Peanut Butter Jelly" (feat. Young Dro & Young Thug)

Ty Dolla Sign - Free TC
15. "Actress" (feat. R. Kelly) (prod. with D'Mile)

Young Thug – Slime Season
01 "Take Kare (feat. Lil Wayne)" 
06 "Power"
08 "No Way"
13 "Again (feat. Gucci Mane)"
16 "Draw Down" 
18 "Wanna Be Me"

Young Thug – Slime Season 2
03 "Don't Know (feat. Shad da God)"
04 "Hey, I"
14 "Bout (Damn) Time"
18 "Never Made Love (feat. Rich Homie Quan)"
20 "No No No (feat. Birdman)"
22 "Love Me Forever (Chopped & Screwed)"

50 Cent – The Kanan Tape
02. "Too Rich For The Bitch"

Yung Ralph - I Am Juugman
17. "Imma Ride (feat. Young Thug & Birdman)"

Figg Panamera - God's Plan
02. "Carlito"
03. "Celebration"
06. "Let Her Breath"
09. "What's up"
10. "Trapflix"
20. "I Told Her Once"

Lil Reese - Supa Savage 2
07. "Baby" (Featuring Young Thug)

Young Jeezy - Church In These Streets
04. "Gold Bottles"
05. "Hell You Talkin' Bout"

Keyshia Cole
 "Don't Waste My Time" (feat. Young Thug)

Jeremih - Late Nights
03. "Impatient" (feat. Ty Dolla Sign)

2016

YG – Off My Bullshit
 "I Wanna Benz" (feat. 50 Cent & Nipsey Hussle)

2 Chainz & Lil Wayne - ColleGrove 
 "Section"

French Montana - Wave Gods
08. "Groupie Love" (feat. Quavo)

Young Thug - Slime Season 3 
 "Memo"
 "Digits"
 "Worth It"
 "Tattoos"
 "Problem"

Bankroll Mafia - Bankroll Mafia
11. "Screwed It Up" (feat. London Jae, Shad da God and T.I.)

Lil Duke - Uber 
 "Paid And Full"

Young Buck - 10 Bodies 
 "No Worries"

Tory Lanez - Fargo Fridays
09. "Unforgetful"

Travis Porter - 285
04. "Trap"
09. "Lame"

Ace Hood - Starvation 5
02. "Message to the label"

Ralo - Diary of the Streets 2
19. "Pull Up" (featuring Birdman & Jaquees)

Young Thug & T.I. - Margiela Music 3
02. "Bobby Womack"

Soulja Boy - Real Soulja 4 Life
04. "Rockstar"

Blac Youngsta - Fuck Everybody
03. "Tissue"

Yung Booke - 6 The Giant
02. "Ain't Nothing Changed"

Gucci Mane - Woptober
01. "Intro: Fuck 12"
06. "Wop"

Dae Dae - The Defanition
01. "Black Lives Matter"
02. "Bullshit" (feat. 21 Savage)
03. "Dead Ass Wrong"
04. "Don't You Change"
05. "Hit The Block"
06. "How You Feel"
07. "Kodak"
08. "Love Life Pages
09. "Ride" (feat TK Kravitz)
10. "Street Shit"
11. "Woke Up"

Gucci Mane & Future - Free Bricks 2K16 (Zone 6 Edition)
02. "Selling Heroin" (co-produced with Southside)

Drake - More Life
 "Sneakin'" (feat. 21 Savage)

Lil Durk - They Forgot
07. "Young Niggas" (feat. Meek Mill)

2017

Trapaholics - Real Trap Shit & Real Niggas Losing Edition
03. "Grave Yard Shift

Bloody Jay - Real Niggas Losing
 04. "No Mask"

Money Man - Black Circle 2
15. "Out The Mud" (Featuring Young Thug)

Philthy Rich - Seminary
12. "Street Life" (Featuring Neno Calvin & Derez De'Shon)

Yung Ralph - I Am Juugman 2
02. "I Know You Know"

Gucci Mane - DropTopWop
08 "Both Eyes Closed" (feat. 2 Chainz & Young Dolph) (Produced with Metro Boomin)

Young Thug - Beautiful Thugger Girls
04. "Daddy's Birthday (co produced w/ Scott Storch)
05. "Do U Love Me"

French Montana - Jungle Rules
09. "Migo Montana" (feat. Quavo)

Sy Ari Da Kid - 2 Weeks No Diss
04. "Traded" (feat. K Camp)

Kodak Black - Project Baby 2
03. "Roll In Peace" (Feat. XXXTentacion) (Produced with Cubeatz)
04. "6th Sense"
05. "Don't Wanna Breath" (Produced with Rex Kudo)
11. "You Do That Shit" (Produced with Cassius Jay)

Derez De'Shon - Pain
01. "Ambition"
Young Penny Hardaway
04. "Hardaway" (with DJ Envy)
07. "Fed Up"
16. "She Wanna Be Down"
00. "Hardaway (Remix) (with DJ Envy, featuring Yo Gotti and 2 Chainz) (leftover track)

Future & Young Thug - Super Slimey
11. “Killed Before”

Yo Gotti - I Still Am
01. “Betrayal” (Co. prod with Southside)

PnB Rock - Catch These Vibes
02. “London”

Derez De’Shon - Thank Da Streets
03. “ Dope Hole” (feat. O.T. Genasis & Uncle Murda)
07. “Don't Push Me”
09. “Just Tryna Live”

2018

Gunna - Drip Season 3
11. “My Soul” (Co. Prod with Metro Boomin)

Various Artists - The Uncle Drew Motion Picture Soundtrack
01. “Cocky” (feat. A$AP Rocky, 21 Savage, & Gucci Mane)

Bo Deal - Good Side Bad Side 2
02. “Ain’t Real” (feat. Derez Deshon & Lil Bibby)

Cash Money Records - Before Anything Motion Picture Soundtrack
07. “You” (feat. Jacquees)
13. “Like U Kno” (feat. Derez Deshon & Jacquees)

Post Malone - Beerbongs & Bentleys
16. “92 Explorer” (Co. Prod w/ Roark Bentley & Aubrey Robinson)

Tee Grizzley - Activated
02. “2 Vaults” (feat. Lil Yachty)
05. “Connect”

Lil Baby - Harder than Ever
12. “Right Now” (feat. Young Thug)

Uncle Drew Motion picture Soundtrack
04. “Cocky” (Co. Prod with Hector Delgado) (feat. A$AP Rocky, Gucci Mane & 21 Savage)

Young Thug - On the Rvn
01. “On The Run” (Co. Prod with Cubeatz)
03. “Climax” (feat. 6lack)
04. “Sin” (feat. Jaden Smith)

T.I. - Dime Trap
07. "At Least I Know" (feat. Anderson Paak)

French Montana - No Stylist EP
01. "No Stylist" (feat. Drake)

Roddy Ricch - Feed The Streets 2
04. “Die Young” (Co. Prod w/ Rex Kudo)

Kodak Black - Dying to Live
02. “This Forever“ (Co Prod with Rex Kudo)

A Boogie wit da Hoodie - Hoodie SZN
04. “Swervin” (feat. 6ix9ine)

Derez De’Shon - Pain 2
05. “Need some Mo” (feat. Lil Baby) (produced with Stoopid Beats)
06. “Fallin” (feat. Russ)
08. “Whaddup Doe” (feat. Mozzy)
17. “Lately”

2019

Paxquiao - Dodgin the Raindrops
05. “Whole Neighborhood” (Prod with Natra Average)
15. “Got it Bad” (feat. Malwande khumalo, K Camp) (Prod with Natra Average)

Dreezy - Big Dreez
09. “No Love” (feat. Derez De’Shon)
10. “Where Them $ @“

DaBaby -  KIRK 
12. “THERE HE GO”

Summer Walker -  Over It 
1. “Over It” (Prod with Aubrey Robinson & Roark Bailey)
2. “Body” (Prod with Aubrey Robinson & Roark Bailey)
3. “Playing Games” (with Bryson Tiller) (Extended Version)
4. “Drunk Dialing...LODT” (Prod with Kevin Richardson, Roark Bailey, Cameron Griffin & Aubrey Robinson)
5. “Come Thru” (with Usher) (Prod with Aubrey Robinson & Roark Bailey)
6. “Potential” (Prod with Aubrey Robinson & Roark Bailey)
8. “Tonight” (Prod with F a l l e n, Aubrey Robinson & Roark Bailey)
10. “Like It” (with 6LACK) (Prod with F a l l e n, Aubrey Robinson & Roark Bailey) 
12. “Stretch You Out” (feat. A Boogie Wit Da Hoodie)
14. “Anna Mae” (Prod with Roark Bailey & Scott Storch)
15. “I'll Kill You” (feat. Jhené Aiko) (Prod with Roark Bailey, Aubrey Robinson & Scott Storch)
16. “Nobody Else” (Prod with Roark Bailey, Aubrey Robinson & Stevie J)
17. “Playing Games”

YK Osiris -  The Golden Child 
12. “Ballin”

Davido -  A Good Time 
6. “D&G” (feat. Summer Walker)

Blac Youngsta -  Church on Sunday 
7. "All I Want" (featuring Jacquees)

French Montana -  Montana 
12. "Wanna Be" (featuring PartyNextDoor)
15. "No Stylist" (featuring Drake)

Fetty Wap -  Fresh N Clean 
"Fresh N Clean"

2020

Lil Gotit -  Superstar Creature 
Executive Producer

A Boogie wit da Hoodie -  Artist 2.0 
1. "Thug Love"
5. "Numbers" (featuring Roddy Ricch, Gunna and London on da Track) 
9. "Calm Down (Bittersweet)" (featuring Summer Walker)

Rich the Kid -  Boss Man 
11. "Ain't No Doubts" 
16. "I Want Mo"

DaBaby -  Blame It on Baby 
10. "Drop" (featuring A Boogie wit da Hoodie and London on da Track)
12. "Nasty" (featuring Ashanti and Megan Thee Stallion)

Ariana Grande -  Positions
12. "Positions"

2022

YoungBoy Never Broke Again - Realer 2
14. "You Knew"

References

External links 

 
 
 
 

Production discographies
 
Hip hop discographies
Discographies of American artists